Lwemiyaga County is a county in the Central Region of Uganda.

Location
Lwemiyaga County is north-west of Mawogola County, and together they form Sembabule District. The county consists of two sub-counties: (a) Lwemiyaga sub-county and (b) Ntuusi sub-county.

Overview
Lwemiyaga County is in the dry cattle corridor of Uganda. Drought is one of the challenges that the county faces, along with bad roads and electricity shortages. Major economic activity is farming of both crops and animals.

See also
 Mawogola County
 Lwemiyaga
 Ntuusi

References

External links
Kabaka on tour of Sembabule ahead of his 21st coronation ceremony tomorrow - 30 July 2014

Counties of Uganda
Sembabule District
Central Region, Uganda